Nils Reinhardt Christensen (13 April 1919 – 8 November 1990) was a Norwegian film director and screenwriter. He directed nine films between 1957 and 1969.

Filmography
 1957: Selv om de er små
 1959: 5 loddrett
 1961: Et øye på hver finger
 1961: Line
 1962: Stompa & Co
 1963: Stompa, selvfølgelig!
 1965: Stompa forelsker seg
 1967: Stompa til Sjøs!
 1969: Psychedelica Blues

References

External links

1919 births
1990 deaths
Norwegian male film actors
Norwegian screenwriters
20th-century Norwegian writers
20th-century Norwegian male actors
20th-century screenwriters